Şehzadeler Tunnel, is a highway tunnel constructed on the Samsun-Çorum highway   in Amasya Province, northern Turkey.

It is situated near Bayat village of Merzifon, Amasya. The -long twin-tube tunnel carrying two lanes of traffic in each direction. The 19 Mayıs Tunnel follows the Şehzadeler Tunnel in direction Samsun.

The tunnel was opened to traffic on 15 February 2009 by Turkish Prime Minister Recep Tayyip Erdoğan.

References

External links
 Map of road tunnels in Turkey at General Directorate of Highways (Turkey) (KGM)

Road tunnels in Turkey
Transport in Amasya Province
Tunnels completed in 2009